MCV Ego is a minibus built by MCV Bus & Coach, unveiled at Coach and Bus Live 2005. Based on the Irisbus LoGo chassis, it is a low-floor minibus, for a market to replace the older step entrance minibuses with 1 step or 2 steps. It was launched at the "Euro Bus Expo" in November 2006.

See also 

 List of buses

Buses of the United Kingdom
Low-floor buses
Minibuses